Sabine Hack was the defending champion but lost in the semifinals to Steffi Graf.

Graf won in the final 6–1, 6–1 against Åsa Carlsson.

Seeds
A champion seed is indicated in bold text while text in italics indicates the round in which that seed was eliminated. The top four seeds received a bye to the second round.

  Steffi Graf (champion)
 n/a
  Iva Majoli (second round)
  Zina Garrison-Jackson (second round)
  Sabine Hack (semifinals)
  Ann Grossman (second round)
  Sandra Cecchini (quarterfinals)
  Chanda Rubin (second round)

Draw

Final

Section 1

Section 2

External links
 ITF tournament edition details
 Tournament draws

Virginia Slims of Houston
1995 WTA Tour